The 1965 Columbia Lions football team was an American football team that represented Columbia University during the 1965 NCAA University Division football season. Columbia tied for last in the Ivy League. 

In their ninth season under head coach Aldo "Buff" Donelli, the Lions compiled a 2–7 record and were outscored 199 to 83. Ronald Brookshire was the team captain.  

The Lions' 1–6 conference record tied for seventh in the Ivy League standings. Columbia was outscored 208 to 61 by Ivy opponents. 

Columbia played its home games at Baker Field in Upper Manhattan, in New York City.

Schedule

References

Columbia
Columbia Lions football seasons
Columbia Lions football